Naveen Reddy (born 9 May 1984) is an Indian former cricketer. He played two List A matches for Hyderabad in 2007.

See also
 List of Hyderabad cricketers

References

External links
 

1984 births
Living people
Indian cricketers
Hyderabad cricketers
Cricketers from Hyderabad, India